Internationale Politik (IP) is the magazine of the Deutsche Gesellschaft für auswärtige Politik (DGAP, German Society on Foreign Relations). It covers contemporary topics  in international affairs under editor-in-chief Martin Bialecki.

History and profile
The magazine was initially published as Europa-Archiv in July 1946 by DGAP founder Wilhelm Cornides a member of the Oldenbourg family, owners of R. Oldenbourg Verlag, a German publishing house started in 1858 by Rudolf Oldenbourg. It was renamed Internationale Politik in 1995. The magazine is based in Berlin. It has German, English, Russian, and Chinese editions. 

In 2002 the publisher was Bertelsmann Verlag. The Russian edition was launched in 1996 and is published every two months. The English edition (launched in 2000) and the Chinese edition (launched in 2005) are both quarterly. In 2009, the German edition changed from monthly to every two months. In 2020, a special edition of Internationale Politik was published as result of the Sylke Tempel Fellowship, a program initiated by the German-Israeli Future Forum Foundation.

See also
List of magazines in Germany

References

External links
  (German edition)
 English edition

1946 establishments in Germany
Bi-monthly magazines published in Germany
Chinese-language magazines
English-language magazines
German-language magazines
Monthly magazines published in Germany
Political magazines published in Germany
Magazines established in 1946
Magazines published in Berlin
Russian-language magazines